Policide may refer to:

Policide, political science term
Policide (engineering), chemical engineering term

See also
Definitions of politicide
Political suicide